Nicole Laird (born 18 February 1993) is an Australian beach volleyball player. She represented her country at the 2016 Summer Olympics in Rio de Janeiro.

Professional career

Rio de Janeiro - 2016 Olympics
Laird made her Olympic debut in Rio with her beach volleyball partner Mariafe Artacho del Solar, whom she met while studying at Killara High School. The pair did not win a match in Rio, losing to the U.S., Switzerland and China in their preliminary pool matches to finish the tournament in 19th place.

References 

1993 births
Living people
Australian women's beach volleyball players
Beach volleyball players at the 2016 Summer Olympics
Olympic beach volleyball players of Australia
21st-century Australian women